Sheriff of Redwood Valley is a 1946 American Western film in the Red Ryder film series directed by R. G. Springsteen and written by Earle Snell. The film stars Wild Bill Elliott, Robert Blake, Bob Steele, Alice Fleming, Peggy Stewart and Arthur Loft. The film was released on March 29, 1946, by Republic Pictures.

Plot

Cast  
Wild Bill Elliott as Red Ryder 
Robert Blake as Little Beaver 
Bob Steele as The Reno Kid
Alice Fleming as Duchess
Peggy Stewart as Molly
Arthur Loft as Harvey Martin
James Craven as Bidwell
Tom London as Sheriff
Kenne Duncan as Jackson
Bud Geary as Strong
John Wayne Wright as Johnny
Tom Chatterton as Doc Ellis
Budd Buster as Express Agent Crump
Frank McCarroll as Pete

References

External links 
 

1946 films
1940s English-language films
American Western (genre) films
1946 Western (genre) films
Republic Pictures films
Films directed by R. G. Springsteen
Films based on comic strips
Films based on American comics
American black-and-white films
1940s American films
Red Ryder films